Beat Mutter (born 22 July 1962) is a retired Swiss football goalkeeper that played for Swiss football clubs Servette FC, AC Bellizona, and FC Luzern.

References

1962 births
Living people
Swiss men's footballers
Servette FC players
AC Bellinzona players
FC Luzern players
Association football goalkeepers